The Lancer 30 Mark IV also called the Lancer 30-4, is an American sailboat that was designed by C&C Design as a cruiser and first built in 1978.

The Lancer 30 Mark IV is a development of the C&C 30, using the molds from that design.

Production
The design was built by Lancer Yachts in the United States from 1978 until 1985, but it is now out of production.

Design
The Lancer 30 Mark IV is a recreational keelboat, built predominantly of fiberglass, with wood trim. It has a masthead sloop rig, a raked stem, a raised counter reverse transom, an internally mounted spade-type rudder and a fixed fin keel. It displaces  and carries  of ballast.

The boat is fitted with an inboard engine for docking and maneuvering.

The design has sleeping accommodation for four people, with a double "V"-berth in the bow cabin and an aft cabin with a double berth on the port side. The galley is located on the starboard side just forward of the companionway ladder. The galley is an open "L"-shaped and is equipped with a two-burner stove and a double sink. A navigation station is opposite the galley, on the port side. The head is located at the companionway on the starboard side.

See also
List of sailing boat types

References

External links
Photo of a Lancer 30 Mark IV
Photo of a Lancer 30 Mark IV

Keelboats
1970s sailboat type designs
Sailing yachts
Sailboat type designs by C&C Design
Sailboat types built by Lancer Yachts